Patriot League Championship or Patriot League Tournament may refer to:

Patriot League men's basketball tournament, the men's basketball championship tournament
Patriot League women's basketball tournament, the women's basketball championship tournament